West Flagler (formerly West Little Havana) is a neighborhood in Miami, Florida, United States, bisected by Flagler Street.  It is roughly located north of the Tamiami Trail (US 41/South Eighth Street) and south of North Seventh Street, between State Road 9 (West 27th Avenue) to the east and LeJeune Road (West 42nd Avenue) to the west.

Demographics 
In the 2010 U.S. Census, West Flagler had a population of 31,407 with a population density of 11,468.2 residents per square mile.

As of 2000, West Flagler had a population of 41,012 residents, with 14,810 households, and 10,490 families residing in the neighborhood.  The median household income was $26,176.70. The racial makeup of the neighborhood was 90.73% Hispanic or Latino of any race, 1.15% Black or African American (non-Hispanic), 7.61% White (non-Hispanic), and 0.49% Other races (non-Hispanic).

See also
 West Flagler Library
 Neighborhoods in Miami

References

Neighborhoods in Miami